Zhang Tailei (June 1898 – 12 December 1927) was the leader of the Guangzhou Uprising, during which he was killed.

Zhang was sent to the Russian Far East in 1921 to make a report to the Comintern for the Chinese Communist Party. Zhang then studied in Moscow for a few years.  However, when he went back to China, he became hostile to the others who had returned to China in 1924.

Zhang emphasized the role of an army that is created out of bandits, the poorest peasants, paupers, and rural lumpenproletarian elements.

References

Literature
Rae Yang: Spider Eaters, Berkeley: University of California Press, 1997,  s. 92.
 

1898 births
1927 deaths
Chinese Communist Party politicians from Jiangsu
Chinese revolutionaries
Delegates to the 4th National Congress of the Chinese Communist Party
Delegates to the 5th National Congress of the Chinese Communist Party
First Secretaries of the Communist Youth League of China
Members of the Politburo Standing Committee of the Chinese Communist Party
Politicians from Changzhou
Tianjin University alumni